Adventurers' Guild Bounty Hunters' Handbook is a supplement for fantasy role-playing games published by Adventurers' Guild in 1988.

Contents
Adventurers' Guild Bounty Hunters' Handbook is a supplement for playing bounty hunter characters, and provides details of 20 wanted criminals.

Publication history
Adventurers' Guild Bounty Hunters' Handbook was written by Brett Dougherty and Todd Dougherty, with artwork by Mike Bjornson, and was published by Adventurers' Guild in 1988 as a 48-page book.

Reviews
Stewart Wieck, the editor-in-chief of White Wolf magazine observed in 1988 that: "The supplement would have been more interesting if villains for a variety of levels had been presented, but many of the characters are very interesting. Several own new or unique magic items and each is given a monetary and experience value".

References

Fantasy role-playing game supplements
Role-playing game supplements introduced in 1988